The Suin–Bundang Line (Suwon–Incheon–Bundang Line) is a commuter rail service of the Seoul Metropolitan Subway system, operating on trackage from the Suin Line (opened on June 30, 2012) and the Bundang Line (opened on September 1, 1994). Operation began on September 12, 2020.

Frequent service is provided between Wangsimni and Incheon by 6-car trains, with 9 trains on weekdays and 5 on weekends running one station north of Wangsimni to Cheongnyangni. However, many trains terminate at various locations on the line such as Jukjeon, Gosaek, and Oido.

Trains travel along the Suin (Incheon-Suwon), Bundang (Suwon-Wangsimni), and Gyeongwon (Wangsimni-Cheongnyangni) lines. It shares trackage with the Ansan Line of Seoul Subway Line 4 between Hanyang University at Ansan and Oido.

Like all other Korail-run Seoul Metropolitan Subway lines, trains on the line run on the left-hand side of the track. 

The color shown on the map is yellow.

History

Future plans
Hagik station is planned to open between Songdo and Inha University in 2023. In addition, a connection line is under consideration at Suwon that will allow KTX trains to run between the Gyeongbu high-speed railway and Incheon Station via the Suin Line by 2025.

Rapid (Express) trains 
Korail operates a variety of express "rapid" (급행) trains for regional services on the Suin-Bundang Line during rush hours. These services include:
 Bundang Line express services, operating express between Gosaek (where they originate or terminate) and Jukjeon and then continuing as local trains to Wangsimni or Cheongnyangni.
 Suin Line express services, operating express between Incheon and Oido (where they originate or terminate).

Stations 
B: Bundang Express Line
S: Suin Express Line

Rolling Stock 
 Korail Class 351000
 1st generation: 351-01~351-22 – since 1993
 2nd generation: 351-23~351-28 – since 2003
 3rd generation: 351-29~351-43, 351–61~351–78 – since 2011
 4th generation: 351-44~351-59, 351-79 - since 2022
 All 4th gen. trains except 351-44 is in trial run or being manufactured.

References 

 
Seoul Metropolitan Subway lines
Railway lines opened in 2020